Serbia men's national under-16 and under-17 basketball team may refer to:
 Serbia men's national under-16 basketball team
 Serbia men's national under-17 basketball team